Donato Giuseppe Frisoni (b. 1681 or 1683, Laino – d. 29 November 1735, Ludwigsburg) was an Italian architect active during the Rococo period in Northern Italy, Southern Germany, and Bohemia.

Biography

Frisoni traveled to and worked in Vienna under , who had been at work in the Austrian capital since 1695. After 1700, Frisoni traveled to Prague to work with his brother-in-law Tomasso Soldati under . In 1708, Frisoni and Soldatti were recruited by Johann Friedrich Nette, court architect in the Duchy of Württemberg, to work as a stuccoist at Ludwigsburg Palace. Frisoni and Soldati began working at Ludwigsburg with in the interiors of its Old Main Building in 1709. Over the winter of 1709, Frisoni returned to Laino and married Anna Maria Allio. Their marriage would produce two children.

Notes

Citations

References
 
 

1683 births
1785 deaths
People from Como
18th-century Italian architects